The C166 family is a 16-bit microcontroller architecture from Infineon (formerly the semiconductor division of Siemens) in cooperation with STMicroelectronics. It was first released in 1990 and is a controller for measurement and control tasks. It uses the well-established RISC architecture, but features some microcontroller-specific extensions such as bit-addressable memory and an interrupt system optimized for low-latency. When this architecture was introduced the main focus was to replace 8051 controllers (from Intel).

Opcode-compatible successors of the C166 family are the C167 family, XC167 family, the XE2000 family and the XE166 family.

As of 2017, microcontrollers using the C166 architecture are still being manufactured by NIIET in Voronezh, Russia, as part of the 1887 series of integrated circuits. This includes a radiation-hardened device under the designation 1887VE6T.

C167 / ST10 family
The Siemens/Infineon C167 family or STMicroelectronics ST10 family is a further development of the C166 family. It has improved addressing modes and support for "atomic" instructions. Variants include, for example, Controller Area Network (CAN bus).

See also
  (CCU, CAPCOM)
 Peripheral Event Controller (PEC)

References

Digital electronics
Microcontrollers